[[Image:75untitled.JPG|thumb|Unit Crest for the 2nd Brigade Combat Team, 2nd Infantry Division. Clearly visible in the image the Armoured Fist, clenching a pair of lightning bolts]]

The armoured fist''' is the symbol of Armoured cavalry. This derives from the fact that armoured cavalry are good for putting stress on a single point until the line breaks. This should not be confused with the American hand-signal for halt or the commonwealth hand-signal for strongarm.

An example an armoured fist is incorporated into the crest of the Royal Canadian Armoured Corps.

The armoured fist's interponent is the infantry's crossed swords.

Cavalry